The 2012–13 NBL season was the 10th season of the New Zealand Breakers in the NBL. The Breakers succeeded in winning their third NBL championship, becoming the second team in the league to win a three-peat.

In the preseason, the Breakers record was 3–3. The Breakers lost their preseason series with the Wollongong Hawks 1–2.

On 24 April 2013, following the conclusion of the 2012–13 season, Lemanis was announced as the new head coach of the Australian men's national basketball team.

Off-Season

Additions 

The Breakers also signed Reuben Te Rangi and Morgan Natanahira as contracted development players and Tai Webster as a non-contracted development player.

Subtractions

Re-signed players 
The Breakers re-signed Cedric Jackson, Leon Henry, Tom Abercrombie, Dillon Boucher, Mika Vukona, C. J. Bruton, Alex Pledger, Daryl Corletto and Josh Bloxham (DP).

Corey Webster also returns to the team, after a 12-month suspension.

Roster

Depth chart

Pre-Season 
The Breakers finished the Preseason with a 3–3 record.

Regular season

Finals 
With the Breakers making the playoffs in 2012/13, it was their fifth appearance in the NBL Finals. If they progress to the Grand Final, it would be their third appearance.

Semi-final 1: vs Kings – 28 March 2013 @ Vector Arena, Auckland
Semi-final 2: @ Kings – 1 April 2013 @ Sydney Entertainment Centre, Sydney
Grand Final 1: vs Wildcats – 7 April 2013 @ Vector Arena, Auckland
Grand Final 2: @ Wildcats – 12 April 2013 @ Perth Arena, Perth

NBL All-Star round 

The NBL All-Star Round was played on 22 December at the Adelaide Arena. Two of the New Zealand Breakers' roster and coach Andrej Lemanis took part in the event.

All-star line up
The New Zealand Breakers were placed in the "South" team for the All-Star game, along with the Adelaide 36ers, Melbourne Tigers and Perth Wildcats. Breakers who played for the South All-Stars were:
 PG: Cedric Jackson
 SF: Thomas Abercrombie

All-star coach 
The Breakers' coach, Andrej Lemanis, coached the South All-Stars team. This was decided because the Breakers had the top NBL ladder spot of the South teams at the end of Round 9, when the decision was made.

Slam dunk competition 
Thomas Abercrombie took part in the Slam Dunk Competition. This was decided by the League Office after the teams nominated players.

Awards

Player of the Week 
 Round 3 – Mika Vukona
 Round 6 – Cedric Jackson
 Round 9 – Cedric Jackson
 Round 11 – Cedric Jackson
 Round 16 – Daryl Corletto
 Round 17 – Cedric Jackson
 Round 22 – Alex Pledger
 Round 23 – Alex Pledger

Player of the Month 
 November – Cedric Jackson
February – Cedric Jackson

Coach of the Month 
 November – Andrej Lemanis
 January – Andrej Lemanis

References 

2012–13 NBL season by team 
2010-11
Breakers
Breakers